Hosni (also spelled Husni or Housni,  or Persian: حُسنی) may refer to:

Places
 Husni, Iran, a village in Isfahan Province

Given name
 Husni al-Barazi, Syrian politician
 Hosni Mubarak, Egyptian politician, fourth President of Egypt
 Husni al-Za'im, Syrian politician, Syrian President and Prime Minister
 Housni Mkouboi, French rapper
 Housni Benslimane, senior Moroccan Gendarmerie officer

Surname
 Amad Al Hosni, Omani footballer
 Dawood Hosni, Egyptian musician
 Kamal Hosni, Egyptian singer and actor
 Larbi Hosni, Algerian footballer
 Mustafa Hosni, Egyptian religious leader
 Rachid Housni, Moroccan footballer

See also
 Hassan (disambiguation) 
 Hassoun